In Catalan mythology, Comte Arnau (Count Arnau) is a legendary nobleman from Ripollès who, for his rapacious cruelty and lechery, is condemned to ride an undead horse for eternity while his flesh is devoured by flames. He is the subject of a classic traditional Catalan ballad. The legend has its origins in a popular song of the sixteenth century.

Legend

The legend of Count Arnau is the quintessential myth of medieval Catalonia. It is based on a popular song that has survived the passage of time. According to tradition, many centuries ago, a certain Count Arnau committed two sins: to succumb to the pleasures of the flesh with an abbess and not paying his vassals for some work they had done for him. The consequence was a punishment that apparently still goes on: to ride eternally on a black horse, accompanied by a group of demonic dogs.

Comte Mal

The Comte Mal (Bad count) is the Mallorcan adaptation of the legendary and mythical Comte Arnau of Catalonia, who was condemned to wander for all eternity as a soul in sorrow on a black horse, with flames getting out through his mouth and eyes, in order to redeem his misdeeds of relations with a nun and not paying promised debts. This evil and legendary character in Mallorca overlaps with a real one: Ramon Safortesa Pacs-Fuster de Vilallonga i Nét, second Count of Formiguera (1627–1694), lord of the old knighthoods of Hero, Santa Margalida, Alcudiola, Maria, Puigblanc, Castellet i Tanca and the Alqueria de Galatzó in Calvià. At the age of 12, the Count of Formiguera inherited from his father two grave lawsuits; one, the entitlement to collect taxes based on royal concessions in favour of the Count on the communal lands of Santa Margalida; and, second, the right to exercise the civil and criminal jurisdiction on the inhabitants of their knighthoods, most of them in the village of Santa Margalida. In short, the attempt to perpetuate a feudal regime in favour of the Count was the source of abuse and violent episodes, which led the popular imagination to relate him with the legend of Count Arnau, known in Mallorca since the Middle Ages through a popular song.

The Comte Mal lost his disputes with the people of Santa Margalida, where he was banished, which did not hinder him from reaching a significant position in the Mallorca of his time. Following the thread of the legend, his appearances on a black horse surrounded by flames, are reported in the mount Galatzó, one of his properties. In the palace Can Formiguera, his house in Palma next to the cathedral in La Portella street, it is said that the Count Mal built the tower characterizing the building, to watch his beloved, a nun of the convent of the Clares. Legend and reality intermingled, thanks to the nineteenth century literature and to an oral tradition, have made of the Comte Mal one of the best-known myths of popular culture in Mallorca.

History of the song

Count Arnau always said he was a lord of the castle Mataplana count is the most popular myth, most discussed in the most representative and emblematic Ripollès passionately, but also is one of the most genuine and original Catalonia. The myth of Count Arnau based on a famous folk song to music: the "Song of the Count Arnau." Count Arnau, a mythical and hidden historical references, is a personality. Although the core is a popular song, is one of the most original creations that gave the legendary Catalan, as there is no equivalent in any other culture, as often happens in popular songs. When Barbarossa, dips (or vampires) and other ogres and evil are part of our cultural tradition and it is time to achieve relief Count Arnau that taking appointed into account the original and popular literary reworkings later. The World Wide Web (WWW) there is only one text that says the figure of Count Arnau. Archaeology of the legend of Count Arnau.

Around this song there is a whole world from the popular tradition that focuses on the adventures of Count Arnau to the people who have studied and writers (a fairly complete compendium of the great figures of modern Catalan literature) that are used to the legends collateral. But would wonder what was first, the chicken or the egg: myth, song or folk tradition. The traditional folk song and myth of Count Arnau was first collected in the mid nineteenth century and scholarly collection and the subsequent development of a world a myth from people who have studied up to legends associated or documented history which there are plenty of things that deserve to be described. To begin at the beginning will discuss how this song came to popularity not only become a popular song. Manuel Fontanals Milan and published the song for the first time Observations on Popular Poetry (1853) and later in the collection Romancerillo Catalan (1882). As Josep Pla (Tour of Catalonia (1971), after the publication of the song for Milan "his success was immense: the myth produced a song full of literary and musical life." Just make the long list of writers Catalan of all literary trends and currents that have existed to see how the success of the "Song of the Count Arnau" has survived through the years

The first version of the song collection of Count Arnau dates from 1843 and was collected from a family based in Barcelona Pyrenees as a result of the collection effort conducted by Marian Aguilo who then gave it to Paul and Piferrer Milan and this Fontanals great characters on a tour of the Renaissance: As explained by Thomas and Careers Artau in the preface to the most comprehensive study done on the song and the myth of Count Arnau, Romeo Figueras (The Myth of "Count Arnau" in the song popular, legendary tradition and literature (1948): "The first version of the song Count Arnau dates from 1843: the Pyrenean recogió of a family based in Barcelona Mariano Aguilar, quien the Radio Pablo Piferrer and extended Manuel Milan and Fontanals". As today, the Eaglet documents kept by the Work of Popular Songs of Catalonia, the song probably was recited by John Aguilo Monbardó "Was the first to put some of the Song of the Count Arnau before conexerla in 1844 in Milan and in Piferrer (according crech) " and as seen in the work of the File Inventory Work of Popular Songs of Catalonia (1993) by Josep Massot i Muntaner. Romeu Figueras mention of this first version as "Origin: Barcelona (Pyrenean a family). COLLECTOR: Mariano Aguilar. Towards 1843. As Thomas says in the foreword to the book Racing Romeo and Lawrence shows us Meadows (The myth of the folk tradition (1988), born this way "line and erudite scholar" on the song Count Arnau will have its culmination Rossend the work of Serra and Josep Romeu Figueras and Labrador

Links
 Comte Mal
 Comte Arnau
 
 

Catalan mythology